Añjana was a king of Koliya dynasty of Nepal, a dynasty that was present around the time of Gautama Buddha, according to Buddhist scriptures. He was the son of the king Devadaha. Añjana had two sons Suppabuddha and Dandapāni, and two daughters Māyā , Pajāpatī and four other.Maya and Pajapati later became the wives of Suddhodana. Maya was the mother of Gautama Buddha.

References

Family of Gautama Buddha
Indian royalty